Beinsdorp is a village in the Dutch province of North Holland. Beinsdorp is named after a former island in the former Haarlemmer Lake.

The village was first mentioned in 1851 as Beinsdorp, and means "Ben's village".

Gallery

References

External links

Populated places in North Holland
Haarlemmermeer